Zyzzyzus is a genus of marine tubulariid hydrozoans, which grow embedded in sponges.

Species
 Zyzzyzus floridanus Petersen, 1990
 Zyzzyzus iyoensis (Yamada, 1959)
 Zyzzyzus parvula (Hickson & Gravely, 1907)
 Zyzzyzus robustus Petersen, 1990
 Zyzzyzus rubusidaeus Brinckmann-Voss & Calder, 2013 
 Zyzzyzus spongicolus (von Lendenfeld, 1884)
 Zyzzyzus warreni Calder, 1988

References

Tubulariidae
Hydrozoan genera